Cerro Oncol is a mountain located in the Cordillera de Oncol, Chile. With its 715 m it is the highest peak of the Chilean Coast Range between Nahuelbuta Range and Corral Bay. Cerro Oncol and its surroundings are located inside Oncol Park.

References
Website about Oncol Park

Mountains of Los Ríos Region
Cerro Oncol
Mountains of Chile